"The Golden Fleece" is the eleventh episode of the third series of the 1960s cult British spy-fi television series The Avengers, starring Patrick Macnee and Honor Blackman. It was first broadcast by ABC on 7 December 1963. The episode was directed by Peter Hammond and written by Roger Marshall and Phyllis Norman.

Plot
Steed accidentally picks up the wrong coat when leaving a Chinese restaurant and discovers a cheque for £5,000 in the pocket. Further investigation reveals that the restaurant is being used as a front for illegal gold smuggling. An unexpected twist to the plot is that part of the proceeds is being used to assist needy ex-servicemen.

Cast
 Patrick Macnee as John Steed
 Honor Blackman as Cathy Gale
 Warren Mitchell as Captain George Jason 
 Tenniel Evans as Major Bob Ruse 
 Barry Linehan as Sergeant Major Wright 
 Robert Lee as Mr. Lo 
 Barbara Yu Ling as Mrs. Kwan 
 Lisa Peake as Esther Jones 
 Ronald Wilson as Private Holmes 
 Michael Hawkins as Corporal James Jones

References

External links

Episode overview on The Avengers Forever! website

The Avengers (season 3) episodes
1963 British television episodes